Dikastes (pl. δικασταί) was a legal office in ancient Greece that signified, in the broadest sense, a judge or juror, but more particularly denotes the Attic functionary of the democratic period, who, with his colleagues, was constitutionally empowered to try to pass judgment upon all causes and questions that the laws and customs of his country found to warrant judicial investigation.

Selection process

In the circumstance of a plurality of persons being selected from the mass of private citizens, and associated temporarily as representatives of the whole body of the people, adjudicating between its individual members, and of such delegates swearing an oath that they would well and truly discharge the duties entrusted to them, there appears some resemblance between the constitution of the Attic dikasterion (court) and an English or American jury, but in nearly all other respects the differences between them are large.  At Athens the conditions of his eligibility were, that the dikast should be a free citizen, in the enjoyment of his full franchise, and not less than thirty years of age, and of persons so qualified six thousand were selected by lot for the service of every year.  Of the precise method of their appointment our information is somewhat obscure, but we may gather that selection took place every year under the conduct of the nine archons and their official scribe; that each of these ten archons drew by lot the names of six hundred persons of the tribe, or phyle, assigned to him; that the whole number so selected was again divided by lot into ten sections of 500 each, together with a  one consisting of a thousand persons, from among whom the occasional deficiencies in the sections of 500 might be supplied.

To each of the ten sections one of the ten first letters of the alphabet was appropriated as a distinguishing mark, and a small tablet called Pinakion, inscribed with the letter of the section and the name of the individual, was delivered as a certificate of his appointment to each dicast. Three bronze plates found in the Piraeus, and described by Edward Dodwell in his Travels, are supposed to have served this purpose. The thousand supernumeraries had in all probability some different token, but of this we have no certain knowledge.

Oath 
Before proceeding to the exercise of his functions the dikast was obliged to swear the official oath, which was done in the earlier ages at a place called Ardettus, just outside Athens, on the banks of the Ilissos, but in later times at some other spot, of which nothing is known.  In the time of Demosthenes the oath asserted the qualification of the dikast, and a solemn engagement by him to discharge his office faithfully and incorruptibly in general, as well as in certain specified cases which bore reference to the appointment of magistrates, a matter in no small degree under the control of the dikast, inasmuch as few could enter upon any office without having had their election submitted to a court for its approbation, or docimasia; and besides these, it contained a general promise to support the existing constitution, which the dikast would of course be peculiarly enabled to do, when persons were accused before him of attempting its subversion.

Allotment 
This oath being taken, and the divisions made as above mentioned, it remained to assign the courts to the several sections of dikastes in which they were to sit.  This was not, like the first, an appointment intended to last during the year, but took place under the conduct of the thesmothetae, de novo, every time that it was necessary to impanel a number of dikastes.  In ordinary cases, when one, two, or more sections of 500 made up the complement of judges appropriated to trying the particular kind of cause in hand, the process was extremely simple.  Two urns or caskets were produced, one containing tickets inscribed with the distinctive letters of the sections; the other furnished with similar tickets to indicate the courts in which the sittings were to be held.  If the cause was to be tried by a single section, a ticket would be drawn simultaneously from each urn, and the result announced, that section B, for instance, was to sit in court F; if a thousand dikastes were required, two tablets would, in a similar manner, be drawn from the urn that represented the sections, while one was drawn from the other as above mentioned, and the announcement might run that sections A and B were to sit in court F, and the like.  A more complicated system must have been adopted when fractional parts of the section sat by themselves, or were added to other whole sections: but what this might have been we can only conjecture, and it is obvious that some other process of selection must have prevailed upon all those occasions when judges of a peculiar qualification were required; as, for instance, in the trial of violators of the mysteries, when the initiated only were allowed to judge; and in that of military offenders who were left to the justice of those only whose comrades they were, or should have been at the time when the offense was alleged to have been committed.

It is clear that the allotment of the dikastes to their several courts for the day took place in this manner, in the marketplace, and that it was conducted in all cases, except one, by the thesmothetae; in that one, which was when the magistrates and public officers rendered an account of their conduct at the expiration of their term of office, and defended themselves against all charges of corruption or inappropriate behavior (or euthyne) in it, the logistae were the officiating personages.  As soon as the allotment had taken place, each dikast received a staff, on which was painted the letter and color of the court awarded him, which might serve both as a ticket to procure admittance, and also to distinguish him from any loiterer that might endeavor to obtain a sitting after business had begun.

Payment 
The dikastes received a fee for their attendance ( or ).  This payment is said to have been first instituted by Pericles, and it is generally supposed from Aristophanes, who makes his character Strepsiades say that for the first obolus he ever received as a dikast, he bought a toy for his son, that it was at first only one obolus.  According to the Scholiast on Aristophanes the pay was subsequently increased to two oboli, but this seems to be merely an erroneous inference from the passage of his author.  Three oboli or the triobolon occurs as early as 425 BC in the comedies of Aristophanes, and is afterwards mentioned frequently.  The German classicist Philipp August Böckh inferred from these passages that the triobolon was introduced by Cleon about 421 BC, but this opinion is disputed, however, and some scholars think that the pay of three oboli for the dikasts existed before that time.

However this may be, this much is certain: the pay of the dikastes was not the same at all times, although it is improbable that it should ever have been two oboli.  The payment was made after every assembly of a court of heliastae by the Kolakretai in the following manner.  After a citizen had been appointed by lot to act as judge in a particular court, he received on entering the court together with the staff ( or ) a tablet or ticket.  After the business of the court was over, the dikast, on going out, delivered his ticket to the prytaneis, and received his fee in return.  Those who arrived too late had no claim to the triobolon.  The annual amount of these fees is reckoned by Aristophanes at 150 talents, a sum which is very high and can perhaps only be applied to the most flourishing times of Athens.

References

Ancient Greek titles
Ancient Greece
Ancient Athens